Polydioxanone (PDO, PDS) or poly-p-dioxanone is a colorless, crystalline, biodegradable synthetic polymer.

Chemistry
Chemically, polydioxanone is a polymer of multiple repeating ether-ester units. It is obtained by ring-opening polymerization of the monomer p-dioxanone. The process requires heat and an organometallic catalyst like zirconium acetylacetone or zinc L-lactate. It is characterized by a glass transition temperature in the range of −10 and 0 °C and a crystallinity of about 55%. For the production of sutures, polydioxanone is generally extruded into fibers, however care should be taken to process the polymer to the lowest possible temperature, in order to avoid its spontaneous depolymerization back to the monomer. The ether oxygen group in the backbone of the polymer chain is responsible for its flexibility.

Medical use
Polydioxanone  is used for biomedical applications, particularly in the preparation of surgical sutures. Other biomedical applications include orthopedics, maxillofacial surgery, plastic surgery, drug delivery, cardiovascular applications, and tissue engineering. For example, with the use of electrospinning, the flexible nature of PDS allows the control of its structure and can be used in applications such as tissue scaffolding.

It is degraded by hydrolysis, and the end products are mainly excreted in urine, the remainder being eliminated by the digestive system or exhaled as CO2. The biomaterial is completely reabsorbed in 6 months and can be seen only a minimal foreign body reaction tissue in the vicinity of the implant. Materials made of PDS can be sterilized with ethylene oxide.

See also
Other biodegradable polymers:

polycaprolactone
polyglycolide
polylactic acid
poly(lactic-co-glycolic acid)
poly-3-hydroxybutyrate

References

Biodegradable plastics
Biomaterials
Polyesters
Polyethers
Synthetic fibers